Spheterista variabilis is a moth of the family Tortricidae. It was first described by Lord Walsingham in 1907. It is endemic to the Hawaiian islands of Molokai and Maui.

The larvae probably feed on Cheirodendron species.

External links

Archipini
Endemic moths of Hawaii
Biota of Molokai
Biota of Maui